Brent Pope (20 February 1973 – 1 November 2022) was a Canadian ice hockey player, and Managing Director of the Cardiff Devils in the Elite Ice Hockey League. Pope was a financial consultant in his hometown area of Hamilton, Ontario and up until his death maintained an active freelance broadcaster career with the Olympic Broadcasting Services and the Olympic Channel.

Playing career
Born in Hamilton, Ontario, Pope started his professional career playing for Cape Breton Oilers and Wheeling Thunderbirds as a free agent signing with the Edmonton Oilers in 1992. In 1996, Pope moved to the United Kingdom signing for the Cardiff Devils. He spent three seasons with the Devils, helping them win the 1996–97 Ice Hockey Superleague championship and the 1998-99 Ice Hockey Superleague Playoff Championship. He went on to play for the GB National Men's Hockey programme between 2002-04 at the World Championship level as well as various clubs in England and North America.

Post-playing career
In May 2007, Pope was appointed Cardiff Devils general manager after winning the Challenge Cup as Co-Coach, Cardiff Devils. He spent time in various roles at the club, and replaced Gerad Adams as head coach in October 2013. Pope created the UK registered charity the Devils Community Foundation in October 2008 incorporating the Junior Devils development into the Senior Devils community outreach programme. Head of the DCF until 2013, Pope coached at both the England U14 & U16 age levels whilst overseeing the junior Devils development.
In 2010, Pope completed his MA in Sports Development & Coaching at Cardiff Metropolitan University and in January 2013 became Managing Director of the professional Cardiff Devils. In October 2013, Pope became interim Head Coach for the Elite Ice Hockey League Devils winning over .600% of games coached before retiring from his position in April 2014.

Media work
Pope was a sports commentator and voice over artist. A BBC Sport commentator for ice hockey at the 2006 Turin 
Olympics, 2010 Vancouver and Sochi 2014 Winter Olympics.

Pope worked for the Olympic Broadcasting Services (OBS) during the London 2012 Olympics commentating on Hockey, Handball, Table Tennis, Fencing and Water Polo. Pope commentated as venue announcer for the Wheelchair Rugby event during the London 2012 Paralympic Games. A Para Ice Hockey Commentator for the OBS during the Turin 2006, Sochi 2014 and 2018 Pyeongchang Paralympics. In January 2011, the Canadian/Brit commentated for the OBS at the Asian Winter Games Men's Ice Hockey Tournament in Astana, Kazakhstan. 
Pope commentated for Honorary Patron HRH Prince Harry of Wales during the inaugural Invictus Games in 2014 for the Wheelchair Rugby competition. The event was hosted in recognition of injured, sick and wounded servicemen & women from around the world at London's Queen Elizabeth II Olympic Park. In 2015, Pope commentated for the ISB (International Sports Broadcasting) at the Baku, Azerbaijan European Games and the Toronto 2015 Pan Am Games on the Men's and Women's Waterpolo, Volleyball, Fencing, Beach Volleyball and Wheelchair Rugby.

Pope was Head of English Ice Hockey Commentary for the Champions Hockey League in Europe between 2014-17 becoming Host of the CHL Centre Ice Online Programme in 2015/16. He covered a variety of sports as a commentator for the OBS Olympic Broadcasting Services during both the Rio 2016 Olympic & Paralympic Games. During Pyeongchang 2018, he commentated for the OBS's Global Feed service on both the Men's and Women's Ice Hockey Tournaments as well as the Para Ice Hockey Tournament during the 2018 Paralympics in South Korea.

Personal life and death
Pope was born in Hamilton, Ontario and held both a Canadian and British passport. He lived in Hamilton and worked as a financial adviser. Pope was a member of the Cardiff Metropolitan University – London 2012 Hall of Fame.

Pope died of cancer in Hamilton on 1 November 2022, at the age of 49.

Career statistics

References

External links

1973 births
2022 deaths 
Deaths from cancer in Ontario
Canadian ice hockey coaches
Canadian ice hockey defencemen
Ice hockey people from Ontario
Sportspeople from Hamilton, Ontario
Peterborough Petes (ice hockey) players
Hamilton Dukes players
Guelph Storm players
Ottawa 67's players
Cape Breton Oilers players
Wheeling Thunderbirds players
London Knights (UK) players
Tallahassee Tiger Sharks players
Florida Everblades players
Nottingham Panthers players
Solihull MK Kings players
Hull Stingrays players
Basingstoke Bison players
London Racers players
Sheffield Scimitars players
Slough Jets players
Romford Raiders players
Cardiff Devils players
Long Island Jawz players
New Jersey Rockin' Rollers players
Ottawa Wheels players
Canadian expatriate ice hockey players in England
Canadian expatriate ice hockey players in Wales
Canadian expatriate ice hockey players in the United States
Naturalised citizens of the United Kingdom
Ice hockey executives
Canadian sports executives and administrators
Alumni of Cardiff Metropolitan University
Ice hockey commentators